The Definitive Collection is a 2006 compilation album by hard rock band Thin Lizzy.

Track listing
"Whiskey in the Jar"
"The Rocker"
"Still in Love with You"
"Showdown"
"Wild One"
"Jailbreak"
"The Boys Are Back in Town"
"Cowboy Song"
"Don't Believe a Word"
"Bad Reputation"
"Dancing in the Moonlight (It's Caught Me in Its Spotlight)"
"Rosalie/Cowgirl's Song" [Live]
"Do Anything You Want To"
"Waiting for an Alibi"
"Chinatown"
"Dedication"

Personnel
Phil Lynott – bass guitar, vocals
Brian Downey – drums, percussion
Eric Bell – guitar on tracks 1–2
Gary Moore – guitar on tracks 3, 13–14
Scott Gorham – guitar on tracks 4–16
Brian Robertson – guitar on tracks 4–12
Snowy White – guitar on track 15
Darren Wharton – keyboards on track 15
John Helliwell – saxophone on track 11

References

2006 compilation albums
Thin Lizzy compilation albums
Mercury Records compilation albums